Basta Ya... Revolución is the second album from Puerto Rican folk singer Roy Brown. The album was released by Disco Libre in 1971.

Track listing

Cultural relevance 

Along with Yo Protesto, this album is considered to be representative of the manifestations and rebellions of the time.

The song "Antonia murió de un balazo" is about the murder of student Antonia Martínez by a police officer during the 1970 riots at the University of Puerto Rico at Río Piedras.

Notes 

1971 albums
Roy Brown (Puerto Rican musician) albums